Mario Guilloti González (20 May 1946 – 25 August 2021) was an Argentine boxer, who won the bronze medal in the men's welterweight (– 67 kg) category at the 1968 Summer Olympics in Mexico City, Mexico. A year earlier he claimed the silver medal at the 1967 Pan American Games. He was born in Chacabuco.

References

External links
 
 
 

1946 births
2021 deaths
Sportspeople from Buenos Aires Province
Olympic boxers of Argentina
Boxers at the 1968 Summer Olympics
Olympic bronze medalists for Argentina
Olympic medalists in boxing
Boxers at the 1967 Pan American Games
Pan American Games silver medalists for Argentina
Argentine male boxers
Medalists at the 1968 Summer Olympics
Pan American Games medalists in boxing
Welterweight boxers
Medalists at the 1967 Pan American Games